Awful may refer to:
 "Awful" (song), a 1999 single by the band Hole
 Awful Orphan, a 1949 cartoon
 Awful Gardner, a notorious gambler
 Awful End, a 2002 children's novel
 "Awful, Beautiful Life", a song by Darryl Worley
 Awful Mess Mystery, a Wolfie album
 The Awful DYNNE, a character from The Phantom Tollbooth
 The Awful Truth, a 1937 comedy
 Something Awful, a comedy website, The Good Earth

See also
 The Awful Truth (disambiguation)